Jeffrey William Batters (October 23, 1970 – August 23, 1996) was a Canadian professional ice hockey defenceman who played 16 games in the National Hockey League in two seasons with the St. Louis Blues, from 1993 until 1995.  Also played for the Kansas City Blades in the IHL.

Batters attended high school at the Athol Murry College of Notre Dame in Wilcox, Saskatchewan where he played for the Notre Dame "Hounds".  His midget AAA hockey team took 2nd place in the Air Canada Cup (the national midget AAA finals)in 1987.  His high school teammates included future NHLers Rod Brind'Amour and Scott Pellerin (the 1992 Hobey Baker winner).

Batters signed as a free agent with the San Jose Sharks in September 1995. He spent the entire 1995–96 season with the Kansas City Blades where he amassed 223 penalty minutes in 77 games. He died at age 25 as one of two fatalities after the pickup truck he was driving drifted off the highway and tumbled into a ditch near Banff, Alberta on August 23, 1996.

See also
List of ice hockey players who died during their playing career

References

External links

1970 births
1996 deaths
Canadian ice hockey defencemen
Sportspeople from Victoria, British Columbia
Kansas City Blades players
Peoria Rivermen (IHL) players
Road incident deaths in Canada
St. Louis Blues draft picks
St. Louis Blues players
Ice hockey people from British Columbia